The early history of Chudasama dynasty of Saurashtra (now in Gujarat, India) is almost lost. The bardic legends differs very much in names, order and numbers so they are not considered reliable. Mandalika Kavya, a Sanskrit poem by Gangadhara, gives some information on dynasty but it has little historical value. Some of their inscriptions gives their early genealogy but they too differ in order of succession. Ranchhodji Diwan, A. K. Forbes, James Burgess and Gaurishankar Oza had tried to fix genealogy and chronology. Based on the dates of the inscriptions assigned to Chudasama kings and other literary sources, the genealogy and chronology of latter half of the dynasty can be established fairly. Still it is certain that they ruled about from about Vikram Samvat (VS) 900 to VS 1527 (c. 875 CE to 1472 CE).

Chronology and Genealogy

Based on Inscriptions

There is no inscription of the period before the king Mandalika I available. Still it is certain that they had established their rule in the Saurashtra region before the Chaulukya king Mularaja came to power in Anahilavada because literary sources tell about battles between Chudasama kings and Chaulukya kings; Mularaja and Jayasimha Siddharaja. Dhandusar inscription (VS 1445) says that the founder of the dynasty was Chudachandra ( also known as ChudaSamma ). A Vanthali inscription tells about Mandalika, a kings whose kingdom was captured by Jagatsimha, a feudatory of Chaulukya king Viradhavala. This Mandalika king must be another Mandalika king mentioned in latter half genealogy. As Viradhavala is known to live in VS 1288, he must be assigned the same date. As Vanthali inscription date VS 1346, it must have been under the Jagatsimha's family till then. It seems that a later Chudasama king Mandalika regained Vanthali when Chaulukya rule weakened. So the later genealogy starts from him in later inscriptions. The Chudasamas continued to rule till VS 1527 (1472 CE) when they were defeated by Gujarat Sultan Mahmud Begada. As inscriptions says about their resistance to Gujarat Sultans, it can be said that they were the most powerful dynasty in Saurashtra region at that time.

Early attempts

Ranchhodji Amarji (1825)
Ranchhodji Amarji, Diwan or prime minister of Junagadh State wrote Tarikh-i-Sorath in Persian in 1825. Ranchhodji wrote that Chudasamas belonged to Chandravanshi and they are descendants of Shri Sadashiv and said to have come from Sindh. He wrote that the regular succession of nine men named Navghan, ten named Jakhra, eleven named Alansingh and other individuals of with various names have ruled.

He had written following chronology in Tarikh-i-Sorath:

After defeat by Mahmud Begada, the sons of Mandalika was given Jagir of Junagadh and made Jagirdar but the powers were exercised by Thanadar appointed by Ahmedabad kings and later by governors.

James Burgess (1876-1882)
James Burgess translated Târikh-i-Soraṭh in English as Târikh-i-Soraṭh, a history of the provinces of Soraṭh and Hâlâr in Kâthiâwâd from Gujarati translations of Persian manuscripts. The translation was edited by James W. Watson and published finally in 1882. He had consulted several manuscripts and taken support of an inscription in Vastupal Jain Temple on Mount Girnar to fix the chronology given by Ranchhodji Amarji which he had published in Report on the Antiquities of Kathiawad and Kachh and subsequently in the translation as an editor note. He had added information of other sources and had done conjectural corrections in the dates as seem required. These corrections are applied only to the dates when converted into CE and where doubtful marked with a (?).

Ranchhodji had listed the reigns of the first four kings beginning with Navaghana I extend over 151 years and then a blank occurs of 22 years between Navaghana II and his successor Mandalika I. Burgess had included Khengar II (1107? CE) omitted by Ranchhodji. Burgess notes that Ranchhodji had omitted Navghana (1235?) after Mandalika whome he had assigned 22 years and 3.75 years, beginning in VS 1270 and the next ruler Mahipala's reign begin in VS 1302 thus 10 years were unaccounted for, or about the same time Navaghana IV reigned. He also noted that Ranchhodji gave three successors of Mugatsingh in order; Madhupat (VS 1416-1421), Mandalika (VS 1421-1439), Malek (VS 1439-1450) which is probably derived from an inscription in Revatikunda which gives following genealogy: Mandalika lll; his son Mahipala; his son Khangara lV; his son Jayasimha; his son Mugatsimha; his sons Mandalika and Melak; and Jayasimha, son of Melak. The chronology in the text is confirmed by the Mandalika Kavya. Burgess had allowed the dates VS 1421 and 1439 to stand but proposed alteration to 1428 and 1433.

Burgess has noted that some copies give the date VS 874 of Navghan's accession, and allow 42 years for his reign. He disapproves of James Tod's counting Chudachandra as the fortieth prince before his own time, and the eighth before Jam Unad, whom Tod had placed in VS 1110, assuming that Chudachand must have lived about VS 960.

After their subjugation to the Ahmedabad kings, the dynasty seems to have been preserved as tributary Jagirdars for another century; the list of these princes stands thus:

Note that some copies give following chronology:

Thus James Burgess has suggested a possible alternate chronology:

James W. Watson (1884) and Harold Wilberforce-Bell (1916)
James W. Watson, in Gazetteer of the Bombay Presidency: Kathiawar Volume VIII (1884), had given the chronology of Chudasama kings. The early kings in chronology were based on the bardic legends and latter chronology was based on the inscriptions.

Harold Wilberforce-Bell wrote The History of Kathiawad from the Earliest Times in 1916. He expanded on the chronology of Watson. In corroboration to inscriptions, the kings starting Mandalik I were correct in chronology but dates of accession varies from later chronologies. He presented following chronology:

References

Chudasama dynasty